Sub-Inspector Thomas Hartley Montgomery (1842 – 26 August 1873, Omagh, Ireland) was a senior official of the Royal Irish Constabulary. He is the only police officer in Irish history to receive the death penalty for murder.

Newtownstewart Murder
On 29 June 1871, Sub-Inspector Montgomery, who was chronically short of funds, assaulted William Glass, a clerk employed by the Northern Bank, with a hedge knife and stabbed him through the head with a filing spike. Sub-Inspector Montgomery then stole £1,600 from the till. In the aftermath, Inspector Montgomery took charge of the investigation and briefly succeeded in deflecting suspicion from himself. However, Montgomery's subordinates ultimately learned of his financial difficulties and eyewitnesses identified him as having left the bank one hour before the body of William Glass was discovered. As a result, a County Tyrone coroner's inquest brought a verdict of willful murder against Sub-Inspector Montgomery.

After two mistrials, the disgraced policeman was convicted of murder and hanged in the Omagh Gaol. His last words were "Is hanging a painful death?"

External links
 Lines on Thomas Hartley Montgomery -- His Last Night in Omagh Jail A murder ballad about the case.

1842 births
1873 deaths
19th-century Anglo-Irish people
Executed Irish people
Irish Anglicans
Irish police officers convicted of murder
Irish police officers
Police officers executed for murder
Royal Irish Constabulary officers
People executed by the United Kingdom by hanging
People executed by Ireland by hanging